Lophocampa pura is a moth of the family Erebidae. It was described by Berthold Neumoegen in 1882. It is found in northern Mexico, Arizona, New Mexico and Texas.

References

 Natural History Museum Lepidoptera generic names catalog

pura
Moths described in 1882